This is a list of butterflies and moths—species of the order Lepidoptera—that have been observed in the U.S. state of Arizona.

Butterflies and moths
A partial list of the butterflies and moths that can be found within the borders of the State of Arizona is:
Achalarus toxeus (strays from south), coyote cloudywing, coyote skipper
Agathymus aryxna, Arizona giant skipper
Agraulis vanillae Gulf fritillary
Asterocampa leilia, emperess Leilia (brushfoot)
Atlides halesus, giant purple hairstreak
Autochton cellus, golden banded skipper
Battus philenor, pipevine swallowtail
Callophrys xami, xami hairstreak
Callophrys eryphon, western pine elfin
Calpodes ethlius
Celotes nessus
Cercyonis pegala, common wood-nymph
Charadra tapa
Chiomara asychis (strays from south), white-patched skipper
Colias cesonia, southern dogface
Colias eurytheme, alfalfa sulfur
Copaeodes aurantiacus, orange skipperling
Cucullia lilacina
Danaus gilippus, queen
Danaus plexippus, monarch
Eacles oslari
Echinargus isola, Reakirt's blue (hairstreak)
Erynnis funeralis, funereal duskywing (skipper)
Erora quadema, Arizona hairstreak
Euptoieta claudia, variegated fritillary
Eurema nicippe, sleepy orange sulfur
Eurema mexicanum, Mexican yellow
Hemiargus ceraunus, Ceraunus blue (hairstreak)
Heliopetes macaira, Turk's-cap skipper
Hyles lineata, white-lined sphinx moth
Hypaurotis crysalus, Colorado hairstreak
Hylephila phyleus, fiery skipper
Junonia coenia, buckeye
Lerodea eufala, Eufala skipper
Leptotes marina, marine blue (hairstreak)
Libtheana carinenta, snout
Lithophane leeae
Manduca quinquemaculata, tomato worm
Megathymus yuccae
Ministrymon leda, Leda hairstreak
Nymphalis antiopa, mourning cloak
Nathalis iole, dainty sulfur
Panthea judyae
Papilio cresphontes, giant swallowtail
Papilio polyxenes, black swallowtail
Phoebis sennae, cloudless sulfur
Phoebis agarithe, large orange sulfur
Phyciodes phaon, Phaon crescent
Panoquina ocola (strays from south in SE-(Madrean Sky Islands)), ocola skipper
Pyrgus albescens, white checkered skipper
Pyrgus ruralis, desert checkered skipper, two-banded checkered skipper
Pyrrhopyge araxes, golf-club skipper
Pyrgus albescens, white checkered skipper
Renia mortualis
Renia subterminalis
Schinia immaculata
Strymon melinus, gray hairstreak
Sympistis cleopatra
Tegeticula yuccasella
Tetanolita negalis
Tricholita ferrisi
Vanessa cardui, painted lady
Vanessa virginiensis, American lady

Lepidoptera of the Atascosa Mountains region
Eacles oslari

Lepidoptera of the Chiricahua Mountains region
Charadra tapa
Lithophane leeae
Tricholita ferrisi

Lepidoptera of the Grand Canyon region
Cucullia lilacina
Schinia immaculata
Sympistis cleopatra

Lepidoptera of the Huachuca Mountains region
Charadra tapa
Eacles oslari
Panthea judyae
Renia mortualis
Renia subterminalis
Tetanolita negalis
Tricholita ferrisi

Lepidoptera of the Patagonia Mountains region
Eacles oslari

Lepidoptera of the Santa Catalina Mountains region
Idia parvulalis–(type locale)

Lepidoptera of the Santa Rita Mountains region
Charadra tapa
Eacles oslari

External links
Moths of south-eastern Arizona

Butterflies
Arizona